Billy Kelleher (born 20 January 1968) is an Irish politician who has been a Member of the European Parliament (MEP) from Ireland for the South constituency since July 2019. He is a member of Fianna Fáil, part of Renew Europe. He previously served Minister of State for Trade and Commerce from 2009 to 2011 and Minister of State for Labour Affairs from 2007 to 2009. He was a Teachta Dála (TD) for the Cork North-Central constituency from 1997 to 2019. He was also a Senator from 1993 to 1997, having been nominated by the Taoiseach.

Biography 
He was educated at Sacred Heart College, Carrignavar, County Cork and third level at Agricultural College Pallaskenrey, County Limerick. He is married to Liza Davis. They have two daughters and one son. He was a cousin of Fine Gael TD Liam Burke.

He was an unsuccessful candidate at the 1992 general election but was nominated by the Taoiseach Albert Reynolds to the 20th Seanad in 1993. Kelleher was first elected to Dáil Éireann at the 1997 general election and retained his seat at the 2002, 2007, 2011 and 2016 general elections. He was Minister of State with special responsibility for Trade and Commerce from 2009 to 2011. He previously served as the Minister of State for Labour Affairs from 2007 to 2009. He was previously the assistant Government Chief Whip. Kelleher was the Fianna Fáil spokesperson on Health. He had called for a rise in the legal age to purchase alcohol from off-licences. He acted as Fianna Fáil's director of elections in 2016.

In December 1992, lawyers for Kelleher claimed that election count in Cork North-Central did not select, as required by regulations, votes from the top of each sub parcel (each parcel having come in to a candidate from a different, earlier candidate). Instead, they argued, votes to be transferred were selected by taking all of the content of a relatively few sub parcels. In January 2006, Kelleher became embroiled in a minor controversy when he was caught speeding outside Cashel, County Tipperary on his way to Leinster House in Dublin. He was fined and received two penalty points on his driving licence. The misdemeanour was ironic, for it came in a week when the government was coming under fire over poor road safety statistics. He retained his seat at the 2011 general election, though an opinion poll from The Irish Times had predicted that he was in danger of losing his seat. 

In 2019, he was elected to the European Parliament as an MEP for Ireland South. Kelleher was a full member of the ANIT committee.

In 2020, he asked party leader Micheál Martin to instigate an independent inquiry into the Fianna Fáil party's decline.

In 2022, he was one of a number of Fianna Fáil politicians who signed a petition calling the government to expel the Russian ambassador following the 2022 Russian invasion of Ukraine. Kelleher travelled with Fianna Fáil senator Timmy Dooley to Poland and Ukraine. During their time in Lviv, they met Mayor Andriy Sadovyi and the governor of the Lviv region, Maxym Kozytsky. When asked by RTÉ how many Ukrainian refugees Ireland should take in, Kelleher said that "Ireland will have to play its part in providing accommodation and lots of it." In March 2022, Kelleher said that Sinn Féin’s decision to remove thousands of media statements shows that its position on “major issues have always been wrong. Even they're embarrassed by them.” In April 2022, he asked Kerry Group (a company in which he owned shares) to cease operations in Russia. Kerry Group decided to suspend their operations in Russia and Belarus, which was welcomed by Kelleher.

References

External links
Billy Kelleher's page on the Fianna Fáil website

 

1968 births
Living people
Fianna Fáil TDs
Irish farmers
Local councillors in Cork (city)
Members of the 20th Seanad
Members of the 28th Dáil
Members of the 29th Dáil
Members of the 30th Dáil
Members of the 31st Dáil
Members of the 32nd Dáil
Ministers of State of the 30th Dáil
You're a Star contestants
Nominated members of Seanad Éireann
Fianna Fáil senators
MEPs for the Republic of Ireland 2019–2024
Fianna Fáil MEPs